John Sigismund may refer to:
 John Sigismund, Elector of Brandenburg (1572–1619)
 John Sigismund Tanner (1705–1775), chief engraver at the Royal Mint of Great Britain
 John Sigismund Vasa (1652), Polish prince who died shortly after birth
 John Sigismund Zápolya (1540–1571), King of Hungary and Prince of Transylvania

Johann Sigismund may refer to:
 Johann Sigismund Elsholtz (1623–1688), German naturalist
 Johann Sigismund Kusser (1660–1727), German-born composer
 Johann Sigismund Riesch (1750–1821), Austrian military officer
 Johann Sigismund Scholze (1705–1750), Silesian music anthologist and poet